Anna Elisabeth Ljunggren (née Storm-Mathisen) (13 September 1943 – 29 April 2010) was a Norwegian physiotherapist.

She took her physiotherapist training in 1964. She took the dr.philos. degree in 1977, as the first physiotherapist in Norway, at the University of Oslo. In 1991 she became the first assisting professor in physiotherapy in Norway, at the University of Bergen, and she was promoted to professor in 1995. She was decorated as a Knight, First Class of the Order of St. Olav in 2009. She died in April 2010.

References

1943 births
2010 deaths
Norwegian physiotherapists
Academic staff of the University of Bergen
Norwegian women academics